Enquin-lez-Guinegatte is a commune in the department of Pas-de-Calais, northern France. The municipality was established on 1 January 2017 by merger of the former communes of Enquin-les-Mines (the seat) and Enguinegatte.

See also 
Communes of the Pas-de-Calais department

References 

Communes of Pas-de-Calais

Communes nouvelles of Pas-de-Calais
Populated places established in 2017
2017 establishments in France